Mexico Squash Federation ("Federación de Squash de México" in Spanish), is the governing body of squash federations and clubs in Mexico.

See also
 Mexico men's national squash team

External links

Squash in Mexico
National members of the World Squash Federation
Squash